United States national hockey team may refer to:

 United States men's national ball hockey team
 United States women's national ball hockey team
 United States men's national field hockey team
 United States women's national field hockey team
 United States men's national ice hockey team
 United States men's national junior ice hockey team
 USA Hockey National Team Development Program
 United States women's national ice hockey team
 United States women's national under-18 ice hockey team
 United States men's national inline hockey team
 United States women's national inline hockey team
 United States national roller hockey team